Gomel Region or Gomel Oblast or Homiel Voblasts is one of the regions of Belarus. Its administrative center is Gomel.

Its largest settlements include: Gomel, Mazyr, Zhlobin, Svietlahorsk, Rechytsa, Kalinkavichy, Rahachow and Dobrush.

Both the Gomel Region and the Mogilev Region suffered severely from the Chernobyl disaster. The Gomel Province borders the Chernobyl Exclusion Zone in places, and parts of it have been designated as mandatory or voluntary resettlement areas as a result of the radioactive contamination.

Administrative territorial entities
Gomel Region comprises 21 districts and 2 city municipalities. The districts have 278 selsovets, and 17 cities and towns.

Districts of Gomel Region

 Akciabrski District
 Brahin District
 Buda-Kashalyova District
 Chachersk District
 Dobrush District
 Gomel District 
 Kalinkavichy District
 Karma District
 Khoiniki District
 Lyelchytsy District
 Loyew District
 Mazyr District
 Naroulia District
 Pietrykaw District
 Rahachow District
 Rechytsa District
 Svietlahorsk District
 Vietka District
 Yel’sk District
 Zhlobin District
 Zhytkavichy District

Cities and towns

Geography

Pripyatsky National Park covers 2% of the territory of the region. Eleven wildlife preserves of national importance cover 2.1% of the region.

The extreme southern point of Belarus is located in Gomel Region, on the Dnieper River to the south of the urban-type settlement of Kamaryn, Brahin District.

The 3rd  largest lake in Belarus, Lake Chervonoye, is located in Gomel Region, Zhytkavichy District.

Gomel Region borders Mogilev Region on the north, Brest Region on the west, Russia (Bryansk Oblast) on the east and Ukraine (Chernihiv Oblast, Kyiv Oblast and Zhytomyr Oblast) on the south and southeast.

Demography

Economy

The processing industry is represented by alcohol, alcoholic beverage, wine, beer and soft drinks, vegetable-drying and canning industries. Mazyr is home to one of Belarus' major oil refineries.

Transport
Gomel Region is a major transport hub. Major railway junctions include Gomel, Zhlobin, and Kalinkavichy. Gomel is located at the intersection of the highways 95E Odessa – Kyiv – St. Petersburg, Bakhmach – Vilnius, and M10 Bryansk – Brest. River transport is also common in the region with regular navigation on the Pripyat, Dnieper and Berezina rivers.

Tourism
The number of travel agencies in Gomel Region has grown from 21 in 2000 to 54 in 2010. Main tourist destinations of the region are Pripyatsky National Park and Gomel.

References

External links
Gomel Oblast Executive Committee
Gomel Regional Executive Committee (Archive) (2004)
Homel Region: Epicentre Of Troubles That Bore Celebrities

 
Regions of Belarus